DNA replication licensing factor MCM2 is a protein that in humans is encoded by the MCM2 gene.

Function 

The protein encoded by this gene is one of the highly conserved mini-chromosome maintenance proteins (MCM) that are involved in the initiation of eukaryotic genome replication. The hexameric protein complex formed by MCM proteins is a key component of the pre-replication complex (pre-RC) and may be involved in the formation of replication forks and in the recruitment of other DNA replication related proteins. This protein forms a complex with MCM4, 6, and 7, and has been shown to regulate the helicase activity of the complex. This protein is phosphorylated, and thus regulated by, protein kinases CDC2 and CDC7.

Interactions 

MCM2 has been shown to interact with:

 AKAP8, 
 Cell division cycle 7-related protein kinase,
 MCM3, 
 MCM4, 
 MCM5, 
 MCM6, 
 MCM7, 
 ORC1L, 
 ORC2L, 
 ORC4L, 
 ORC5L,  and
 Replication protein A1.

See also 
Mini Chromosome Maintenance

References

Further reading